William Neilson Gemmill (14 June 1900 – 18 September 1987) was a Welsh cricketer. Gemmill was a right-handed batsman who bowled right-arm medium-fast.  He was born in Thio on the French Pacific island of New Caledonia.

Gemmill made his debut for Glamorgan when the Welsh county was still a Minor county, making his first appearance for the county against Cheshire in the 1920 Minor Counties Championship.  He played a further match for the county that season, against Devon.  After the 1920 season, Glamorgan were given first-class status for the 1921 season.  It was in this season that Gemmill made his first-class debut in the County Championship against Leicestershire.  He played first-class cricket for Glamorgan from 1921 to 1926, making 47 first-class appearances.  In his 47 first-class matches for Glamorgan, he scored 1,169 runs at an average of 13.59, with a high score of 77.  This score, one of four fifties he scored for Glamorgan, came against Sussex in the 1922 County Championship.  He also made a single first-class appearance for Wales in 1923 against Scotland.  In this match, he scored 74 runs in the Welsh first-innings, before being dismissed by John Fergusson, with Wales winning by an innings and 111 runs.

He died in Canterbury, Kent, England on 18 September 1987.

References

External links
William Gemmill at ESPNcricinfo
William Gemmill at CricketArchive

1900 births
1987 deaths
People from South Province, New Caledonia
Welsh cricketers
Glamorgan cricketers
Wales cricketers